The Carlos Palanca Memorial Awards for Literature winners in 1964 (rank, title of winning entry, name of author).


English division
Short story
First prize: “A Wilderness of Sweets” by Gilda Cordero Fernando
Second prize: “The Dream Tiger” by Lilia Pablo Amansec
Third prize: “Mud Under the Sea” by Julian E. Dacanay Jr.

Poetry
First prize: “A Stun of Jewels” by Carlos Angeles
Second prize: “Becoming Dark, Sunflower by Van Gogh, Out of the Parrot Cage...” by Emmanuel Torres
Third prize: “The Lady of October and Image of the Dancer” by Rita Baltazar Gaddi

One-act play
First prize: “It's April, What are We Doing Here” by Rolando S. Tinio
Second prize: “Rise, Terraces” by Wilfrido D. Nolledo
Third prize: “Out of Darkness” by Nestor Torre Jr.

Filipino division
Short story
First prize: “Mga Aso sa Lagarian” by Dominador Mirasol
Second prize: “Si Ama” by Edgardo M. Reyes
Third prize: “Dugo sa Ulo ni Corbo” by Efren R. Abueg

Poetry
First prize: “Alamat ng Pasig” by Fernando Monleon
Second prize: “Ito ang Ating Panahon” by Bienvenido Ramos
Third prize: “A Group of Poems Published in Halimuyak 101” by Vedasto Suarez

One-act play
First prize: “Sinag sa Karimlan” by Dioisio S. Salarzan
Second prize: “Babasagang Alon” by Orlando C. Rodriguez
Third prize: “Kintin” by Benjamin P. Pascual

References
 

Palanca Awards
1964 literary awards